Ellison Adger Smyth Jr. (October 26, 1863 – August 19, 1941) was a professor of zoology, a scientific collector and a college football coach.  He was the creator and first head coach of the Virginia Tech Hokies football program. He coached the team in the 1892 and 1893 college football seasons. In addition to his athletic career, he was professor and founding head of the biology department (1891–1925) and the first Dean of the Faculty (1902–1906) at Virginia Tech. Smyth Hall, home of the Department of Crop and Soil Environmental Science at Virginia Tech, is named in his honor.

Head coaching record

References

1863 births
1941 deaths
Virginia Tech Hokies football coaches
Virginia Tech faculty
People from Clarendon County, South Carolina
American entomologists